Viva Zapatero! is a 2005 documentary by Sabina Guzzanti telling her side of the story regarding the conflict with Silvio Berlusconi over a late-night TV political satire show broadcast on Rai 3.

The  show, RAIot (a play on the name of the Italian state public TV: RAI, and the English word riot), lampooned prime minister Berlusconi. Since it wasn't considered a satirical show, but a political one, it was cancelled after the first episode.

Origin
Viva Zapatero! is titled after the famous "Viva Zapata!" and it also refers to the then Spanish Prime minister, José Luis Rodríguez Zapatero, who, immediately after gaining power in Spain in April 2004, ensured that the head of the state-run public broadcaster would no longer be a political appointee  (as opposed to Italy).

Story

The TV broadcasting of the satirical program RAIot was censored in November 2003 after the comedian, Sabina Guzzanti, made outspoken criticism of the Berlusconi media empire. Mediaset, one of Berlusconi's companies, sued the Italian state broadcasting company RAI because of the Guzzanti show asking for 20 million Euro for "damages" and from November 2003 she was forced to appear only in theatres around Italy.

In August 2005, it was the sleeper hit of the Venice International Film Festival, receiving a 15-minute standing ovation after its premiere screening. When it opened in Italian theaters, over 200,000 people went to see it in the first week. Its success resulted in an invitation to the 2006 Sundance Film Festival.

Awards
Official Selection – Sundance Film Festival 2006
Official Selection – Tribeca Film Festival 2006

See also
Censorship
Fahrenheit 9/11 
Freedom of the press 
Freedom of speech
Satire

References

External links
Official site
 
Viva Zapatero!
'Viva Zapatero' and Italian Censorship A film about free speech and the state of the Italian media
Filmmakers bugged about Berlusconi
Viva Zapatero! – Towards a new type of information in Italy?
european-films.net review written by Boyd van Hoeij
Movie Night: Viva Zapatero
Viva Zapatero! (2005)

Italian documentary films
Documentary films about politics
Works about Silvio Berlusconi
Italian independent films
Italian political satire films
Works about censorship
Censorship of broadcasting
2005 films
2005 documentary films
Mediaset
Films directed by Sabina Guzzanti